William Stephens Turner Mellish Meryweather (3 January 1809 – 4 May 1841) was an English cricketer who was associated with Cambridge University Cricket Club and made his first-class debut in 1829.

He was educated at Charterhouse and Trinity College, Cambridge. In 1830, while he was at Cambridge, he and his two younger brothers took the surname of Turner in compliance with his grandfather's will, so that he became William Stephens Turner Mellish Turner. He was called to the Bar in 1831.

References

1809 births
1841 deaths
English cricketers
English cricketers of 1826 to 1863
Cambridge University cricketers
People educated at Charterhouse School
Alumni of Trinity College, Cambridge
English barristers